Kahawatta is a town in the Ratnapura District, Sabaragamuwa Province, Sri Lanka.

The town and its surrounding area is recognised for its large tea plantations and the gem industry. According to local folklore, the area was popular for providing turmeric to the Maha Saman Devalaya of Ratnapura. As a result, the area is known as Kahawatta, which means the "turmeric garden".

Transport 
Kahawatta is situated at the intersection of the Nonagama - Pelmadulla Road (A18) and the Watapotha - Opanayake Road, on the banks of the Wey Ganga.

See also 
 Karawwa
 Kahawatta Divisional Secretariat

References 

Populated places in Ratnapura District